The New Ecological and Social People's Union (NUPES) is a left-wing electoral alliance of political parties in France. Formed on May Day 2022, the alliance includes La France Insoumise (LFI), the Socialist Party (PS), the French Communist Party (PCF), Europe Ecology – The Greens (EELV), Ensemble! (E!), and Génération.s (G.s), and their respective smaller partners. It was the first wide left-wing political alliance since the Plural Left in the 1997 French legislative election. Over 70 dissident candidates who refused the accord still ran.

Per a press release, the union's founding goal for the 2022 French legislative election was to deny Emmanuel Macron's Ensemble Citoyens on the centre-right a presidential majority in the National Assembly, and to also defeat the French far-right. EELV and LFI signed an agreement that had the alliance won a majority of seats, they would have put forward Mélenchon as prime minister of France for a cohabitation. NUPES won the most seats outside of Ensemble, denying Macron a majority; at the same time, they underperformed expectations, only winning about 22% of the seats despite obtaining 31% of the popular vote, while the far-right National Rally obtained its best result ever and was likely to be the largest parliamentary opposition group due to NUPES being an alliance of parties.

History

Formation 
In October 2021, shortly before the 2022 French presidential election, Jean-Luc Mélenchon, the initiator of the coalition, launched the People's Union. In December 2021, he announced the creation of a Parliament of the People's Union, which aimed to bring together personalities from outside La France Insoumise (LFI) in order to support its candidacy.

In the context of the 2022 French legislative election, LFI, the largest left-wing force in the presidential election, sought to unite the main left-wing parties around the banner of the New People's Ecological and Social Union. Discussions were held with the Europe Ecology – The Greens (EELV) and the French Communist Party (PCF), which joined the coalition on 2–3 May 2022, respectively, while the Socialist Party (PS), after having reached an agreement to join the coalition on 4 May, voted to do so in its National Council on 5 May. After that, the New Anticapitalist Party (NPA) announced it would not enter the coalition due to insurmountable ideological differences with the PS; it also said it would support the coalition's candidates that belonged to the radical left-wing. The Republican and Socialist Left (GRS) said it would negotiate its entry into the union.

Two groupings of smaller left-wing parties reached out to the coalition seeking to start negotiations: the Federation of the Republican Left, composed of GRS along with the Citizen and Republican Movement, Engagement, Left Radicals, and the New Socialist Left, and the Social and Ecologist Rally, composed of Allons Enfants, Democratic and Social Left, Liberté Ecologie Fraternité, New Deal, and Together on Our Territories. Failing to do so, the GRS and its allies announced its intention to run 100 candidates. On 20 May, New Deal announced that it was withdrawing its candidates and endorsing NUPES candidates around the country.

Expansion 
With the aim of a coalition agreement, EELV proposed changing the name People's Union to Popular and Ecologist Union, or People's Ecologist and Social Front. Shortly before 2 May, an agreement was concluded with EELV, under the common banner of the New Ecological and Social People's Union. The agreement provided for 100 constituencies out of 577 for the environmental bloc. EELV wanted the centers of the cities won in the 2020 French municipal elections. It obtained Bordeaux, Strasbourg, and Lyon, as well as the 3rd, 5th, 8th, and 9th constituencies of Paris. On 3 May, the PCF announced that it would join the coalition. In its press release, the party said it would want to form a majority with its allies and that the PCF and LFI share "common pragmatic objectives".

The PS initially ruled out talks with LFI, before joining the talks on 27 April; the talks were again suspended on 29 April. The PS leader Olivier Faure negotiated with LFI in its headquarters on 2 May. A day later, Manuel Bompard, the negotiator for LFI, said that negotiations between the parties had been "difficult on merits and on the constituencies". On 4 May, the PS came to an agreement in principle with the coalition, subject to a vote by the party's national council the next day. The national council ratified the agreement on 5 May. After the PS was admitted, the NPA announced that it would not formally join the coalition but said it would support more radical left-wing NUPES candidates.

2022 French legislative election 
In the first round of the 2022 French legislative election, NUPES finished either second (per the Ministry of the Interior) or first (per Le Monde), slightly behind or ahead of Ensemble (25.75%–25.66% per the Ministry of the Interior and 26.1%–25.9% per Le Monde). This was because some NUPES candidates had not had their affiliation registered by the Ministry of Interior, which French media took in consideration. Four LFI candidates were elected in the first round, the most of any party or coalition, and 471 NUPES candidates qualified for the second round, the most of any coalition; of the over 70 dissident candidates, 15 qualified for the second round.

After the second round, NUPES was forecast to win 149 seats, resulting in a hung parliament and the loss of an absolute majority for Macron's Ensemble. As NUPES was only an electoral agreement and each party is expected to form its own parliamentary group, it did not become the largest parliamentary opposition group. As with the first round, several news outlets, such as Le Monde, gave a different result as to the final seat count, with NUPES on 142 rather than 131 due to differences as to candidates, particularly in the French overseas constituencies, being classified as members of these alliances or not.

Electoral results and aftermath 
Depending on the method of calculation, NUPES won either 131 seats (according to the Ministry of the Interior) or 142 (according to Le Monde), enough to deny Macron's Ensemble Citoyens coalition a parliamentary majority and to form the formal opposition in Parliament. The coalition performed worse than most polls between the first and second round indicated, and the far-right National Rally (RN) gained 89 seats, its best result ever.

Fabien Roussel, leader of the PCF, said of the results: "[NUPES] didn't allow us to have a majority, and it didn't prevent the far right from making strong progress either, and that calls out to me, that questions me ... I can see that the alliance only speaks to part of France, to that of the big cities, and not to that of rurality." He also praised the alliance for having led the French Left to win far more seats than in the 2017 French legislative election.

The day after the election, LFI's Jean-Luc Mélenchon said the results were "disappointing" and called for a united NUPES parliamentary group, as no individual party in NUPES exceeded the 89 seats won by the RN, and official opposition could fall to the RN if NUPES was unable to form a larger parliamentary group. The leaders of EELV, PCF, and PS announced that they were opposed to a unified group in parliament. Mélenchon said that he would not take part in talks with Macron for government, while leaders of two NUPES parties, the PS leader Olivier Faure and the PCF's Roussel, stated that they would do so. LFI requested a vote of no confidence to be held on 5 July, but did not pass with only NUPES voting for it.

Despite the formation of separate groups in the National Assembly, NUPES voted as a bloc to elect Éric Coquerel of LFI President of the Finance Committee, defeating candidates from RN and The Republicans. The post of President of the Finance Committee traditionally goes to the largest opposition group in parliament.

Members
The initial agreement, struck on 1 May 2022, brought together La France Insoumise and its allies together with a grouping of ecologist parties, including Europe Ecology – The Greens, Ecology Generation, Génération.s, and The New Democrats. On 3 May, the French Communist Party agreed to join the alliance, followed by the Socialist Party and Place Publique on 4 May. On 20 May, New Deal announced its endorsement of the coalition.

Candidates

Breakdown by constituency

Dissident candidates 
A number of candidates, mostly from the PS, announced their intention to stand for election even against a NUPES-backed candidate. Xavier Perrin, a PS candidate in Loire-Atlantique's 8th constituency, said he would remain a candidate against Matthias Tavel of La France Insoumise and NUPES. The four PS candidates in Dordogne also announced they would remain in the campaign despite the appointment of non-PS NUPES candidates in their constituencies. Michèle Picard, the PCF candidate in Rhône's 14th constituency, declared that she would continue her candidacy despite the appointment of another NUPES candidate, Taha Bouhafs. After a PS dissident entered the same race, Bouhafs withdrew, and Picard hoped to become the official NUPES candidate. Picard eventually withdrew from the race and supported the alternative LFI candidate. Lamia El Aaraje, the PS incumbent in Paris's 15th constituency, also announced that she was proceeding with her candidacy despite the appointment of NUPES candidate Danielle Simonnet. PS incumbent Sylvie Tolmont stood in Sarthe's 4th constituency.

As of 10 June, there were six EELV dissident candidates, 62 PS dissident candidates—including two PS dissidents in the same constituency—and 11 PCF dissident candidates running against NUPES-endorsed candidates. There were also four LFI dissidents running against NUPES candidates, including incumbent Muriel Ressiguier. Overall, the dissident candidates, especially from the PS, performed poorly in the first round of the election; only 15 dissident candidates, of the over 70 running, qualified for the second round, mainly from rural constituencies and overseas.

Patrick Mennucci, member of the PS minority current Debout socialiste and an opponent of the NUPES accord, said that the result proved that "if the PS had led its game out of NUPES, it would have had at least as many deputies, and perhaps more voters, those who could not bring themselves to vote [LFI]. All this, without being in the hands of LFI." Despite criticism of Mélenchon on the evening of the first round, Delga announced her support for NUPES candidates in second-round elections where dissident candidates were not present. In response to Delga, Narassiguin said the result of the first round marked "the failure of those who had campaigned on the theme 'NUPES is not my left'. They are seen as dividers." Philippe Doucet, a NUPES opponent within the PS, said that "the dynamics of [NUPES] are strong", that dissidents "did not play much", and the legislative elections "have become totally presidential". He added that he feared the second round would become an "anti-Mélenchon referendum", which in his view would harm PS candidates.

Ideology and platform 
The coalition has been characterised as leftist. The participants share several proposals, including the increase in the minimum wage after tax to €1,500 per month, the return to retirement at 60, the freezing of the prices of basic necessities, ecological development, and the establishment of a Sixth Republic (France being in its Fifth Republic). The coalition aims to obtain a majority in the National Assembly in order to impose cohabitation on President Emmanuel Macron and to have Jean-Luc Mélenchon appointed as prime minister. Some PS members regarded participation in the European Union as a "red line" and a compromise was reached, with the coalition embracing a "common goal" of changing the European Union from a "liberal and productivist" project to one "in the service of ... ecology and solidarity".

Members of the coalition have pledged to jointly support 95% of the programme's proposals once in the parliament, while for the remaining 5%, particularly on the nuclear issue, they are given independence. 170 economists signed a letter in support of the union's economic programme.

Reactions 
While the French Left hailed the negotiations as historic, it was not without criticism for the coalition's perceived Euroscepticism and alleged break with the social-democratic left and Socialist Party (PS) values. Libération criticised the coalition for its perceived Euroscepticism, calling such positions "a historical mistake" and arguing that "the Left must proclaim loud and clear its commitment to the European Union". L'Humanité praised the coalition as "a historical rally".

According to an Elabe survey commissioned by BFM TV, 84% of left-leaning people supported NUPES. A number of French economists, such as Julia Cagé, Bernard Friot, and Thomas Piketty, also reacted favorably to the union and its economic programme, and published a column in support on Le Journal du dimanche.

PS majority and social-democratic left 
Many PS mayors have supported NUPES and called for the PS to join the alliance. Nantes mayor Johanna Rolland attributed the failure of the PS and the left, including La France Insoumise (LFI), to reach the second round in the 2022 French presidential election to PS's failure to form a union with LFI. Among PS mayors, Nathalie Appéré (Rennes), Benoît Arrivé (Cherbourg-en-Cotentin), Olivier Bianchi (Clermont-Ferrand), Mathieu Klein (Nancy), Benoît Payan (Marseille), Nicolas Mayer-Rossignol (Rouen), and Cédric Van Styvendael (Villeurbanne) published a forum expressing their support for NUPES while reaffirming a "deep attachment to the idea" of European integration. Lille mayor Martine Aubry called on the PS to join NUPES whilst saying that it does not "correspond in all respects to [her] deep convictions". Such support for a union with LFI was thought to have gone against the positions of many tenets and historical figures of the PS, including François Hollande, the PS former president of France, and Bernard Cazeneuve, the PS former prime minister of France. During the party's National Council on 5 May, the agreement was ratified and the PS joined NUPES. At the event, many PS personalities approved the union, notably Christophe Clergeau, Corinne Narassiguin, and Laurence Rossignol. Olivier Faure, the PS First-Secretary, welcomed the accord.

André Laignel, the vice-president of the Association of Mayors of France, said that the traditional centre-left parties (PS and EELV) represent greater local support than their results in the 2022 presidential election showed. He encouraged a union between the PS and other forces of the left, saying, "it is clear that if the left is not united, it is going to be defeated". 2007 presidential candidate Ségolène Royal said she supported NUPES, acknowledging LFI's hegemony on the left; she criticised the disunity of the left at the time of the presidential election, arguing that it was a "lack of responsibility", and called for a tactical vote for Mélenchon. Stéphane Troussel, the PS president of the Departmental Council of Seine-Saint-Denis, condemned disunity and called for the PS to join NUPES; he said that not finding an agreement would be a mistake. 1995 presidential candidate Lionel Jospin said he supported NUPES but wished the nomination in the 15th arrondissement of Paris to go to the outgoing PS deputy Lamia El Aaraje.

Journalist and Place Publique politician Raphaël Glucksmann announced his support for NUPES, arguing that he wanted to avoid a majority of President Emmanuel Macron's La République En Marche! (LREM), which formed Ensemble Citoyens, and of the National Rally (RN). While mentioning his many disagreements with LFI and that he does not favour Mélenchon as prime minister ("I don't chant 'Mélenchon Prime Minister' every morning"), he said he would do "everything so that the maximum number of solidarity, humanist, and environmentalist voices can be heard from this summer in the Assembly". New Deal withdrew all of its candidates and declared its support for NUPES.

PS minority and social-democratic left 
According to Le Monde, disapproval and dissension to join NUPES have been a minority in the PS, and are due to political figures from older currents of the party, in particular those close to Hollande, commonly called the "Elephants of the Socialist Party"; centre-left dissent was driven by some regional success against LFI and represented by Carole Delga, a PS member and the president of Occitania, and Anne Hidalgo, the PS mayor of Paris and 2022 presidential candidate. The press often called such dissent press the "new slingers", an expression taken up by Stéphane Le Foll, who said that if the PS "continues to be what it is today, I will leave". He said that he does not believe in a victory for NUPES at the 2022 French legislative election; for him, it is "a fable, ... a decoy", stating that by negotiating with LFI, the PS is "turning its back on its entire history".

At the start of negotiations with the PS, Hollande evoked the risk of the erasure of the PS, saying that the agreement was not acceptable and that it "calls into question the very principles which are the foundations of socialist commitment". Mélenchon responded by saying that "while the train of history is passing, he remains at the track". Hollande called any union of the PS and LFI "unacceptable", leading Mélenchon to call Hollande a "total has-been". Speaking to Hollande in a program where he was invited, TV host Patrick Cohen contested his analysis by recalling that the PS had already promoted in its history, such as under François Mitterrand and Lionel Jospin, a line of rupture and assumed a challenge to the European treaties; he said that NUPES does not "break with the tradition of the PS ... but turns its back on François Hollande's five-year term".

Over 1,000 PS members called for Faure to back out of negotiations. Hidalgo lobbied against the union and called for a union of the left, excluding Mélenchon and his party. Cazeneuve announced his resignation from the party on 3 May 2022 due to the negotiations. In the wake of the PS joining the union, Delga warned NUPES that she would support "independent socialists" who ran against non-PS NUPES candidates. As part of the NUPES accord, the PS received six seats out of the 49 in Occitania, which Delga believed was not a "fair representation" for the party in the region.

In a letter to party activists, Guillaume Lacroix of the Radical Party of the Left announced that it would not join the coalition, and criticised the parties that did so, claiming that they had betrayed their values. He also wrote that he feared he was witnessing "the death of the social-democratic left". The Movement of Progressives, formerly part of the Ecologist Pole, was also critical of the agreement, saying, "negotiating with FI constitutes an intolerable betrayal by irresponsible apparatchiks".

Extra-parliamentary left 
The New Anticapitalist Party reacted negatively to the PS's potential inclusion in the union, saying that it does not believe the PS is a force for social change; it failed to negotiate an agreement with NUPES and ran its own candidates separately, whilst supporting the union's more left-wing candidates. Opposition also came from Lutte Ouvrière, which announced that the party would run its own slate separate from NUPES, and accused the union of reformism.

Presidential majority 
François Bayrou commented that this agreement was "an extremely sad event", citing the pact's perceived Euroscepticism, which according to him would lead to "the end of Europe", and Mélenchon's desire to leave NATO. LREM deputies, in particular Aurore Bergé and Sacha Houlié, were critical of NUPES. LREM members seek to discredit NUPES by highlighting the heterogeneity of their ideological positions. While hoping that LFI could serve as a foil for pro-European voters who could then mobilize for LREM, they regretted the union, considering its "undeniable power in the first round", and recalled that they had benefited from the left's disunity in certain constituencies in the 2017 French legislative election. Stanislas Guerini, general delegate of Renaissance and Ensemble Citoyens of the presidential majority, made an appeal to PS members opposed to the union, asking them to "join us".

After the first round, having criticized Mélenchon for calling on voters not to vote for Marine Le Pen (instead of a full-endorsement of Macron) in the 2022 French presidential election, the presidential majority faced a choice in contests between left-wing and far-right candidates. Party officials said they would decide on a "case-by-case basis". Élisabeth Borne, Prime Minister of France, said: "Our position is not a single vote for the RN." At the same time, she expressed support only for NUPES candidates who in her view respect republican values.

See also
Popular Front (France)
Republican Front (France)
Union of the Left (France)
Greens and Left Alliance, political alliance in Italy inspired by NUPES
People's Union (Italy), political alliance in Italy inspired by NUPES

Notes

References

2022 establishments in France
French Communist Party
La France Insoumise
Left-wing parties in France
Left-wing political party alliances
Political parties established in 2022
Political parties of the French Fifth Republic
Political party alliances in France
Socialist Party (France)
Jean-Luc Mélenchon